The cantons of Nancy are administrative divisions of the Meurthe-et-Moselle department, in northeastern France. Since the French canton reorganisation which came into effect in March 2015, the city of Nancy is subdivided into 3 cantons. Their seat is in Nancy.

Population

References

Cantons of Meurthe-et-Moselle